Braveheart is a video game based on the film of the same name. It was developed by Scottish studio Red Lemon Studio and published by Eidos Interactive for Windows in 1999.

Reception

The game received mixed reviews according to the review aggregation website GameRankings. Adam Pavlacka of NextGen said, "On paper, Braveheart sounds great. In reality, however, it's a convoluted attempt at a game that's more work than play."

References

External links
 

1999 video games
Cultural depictions of William Wallace
Eidos Interactive games
Real-time strategy video games
Video games based on films
Video games developed in the United Kingdom
Video games set in the Middle Ages
Video games set in Scotland
Windows games
Windows-only games